Hassan Al-Heji (born July 10, 1987) is a Saudi football player who plays a midfielder for Al-Nahda.

References

1987 births
Living people
Saudi Arabian footballers
Al-Fateh SC players
Khaleej FC players
Al-Riyadh SC players
Al-Hazem F.C. players
Al-Tai FC players
Al-Ain FC (Saudi Arabia) players
Al-Nahda Club (Saudi Arabia) players
Place of birth missing (living people)
Saudi First Division League players
Saudi Professional League players
Association football midfielders
Saudi Arabian Shia Muslims